Giovanni Domenico Perotti (January 20, 1761 – March 24, 1825) was an Italian composer.

References

1761 births
1825 deaths
Italian composers
Italian male composers